Ashbourne College is a private school and sixth form located in Kensington, London, England.

Ashbourne was founded in 1981 by its current principal Michael Kirby. The college offers A-level and GCSE courses in a coeducational environment and it's affiliated to the CIFE group of independent colleges. Their students are selected from all over the world, resulting in the general ratio of around 60% British and 40% International students. One of their primary focuses is securing students places at Russell Group Universities, whilst maintaining a strong performance in grade outcomes, averaging around 47% A*-A for the past decade.

Ashbourne College is rated as Outstanding by OFSTED in December 2021, Good in 2018, and Outstanding in the 2010 report.

Ashbourne is one of the top colleges in the country for grade improvement, placing in the top 5% of schools for 'value added'. This translates to students improving their grades by 1.5 levels on average from the grades they began their studies with.

Location
Ashbourne is located in Central London in the Borough of Kensington and Chelsea. The college has three buildings on High Street Kensington. Their main building's address is 17 Old Court Place, London W8 4PL. Their second building is located on Young Street, above Natwest Bank. Their third is just off the main high street in Kensington Court between Cote Restaurant and Arcadia.

Courses
The majority of students take two-year A-Level courses, but Ashbourne also offers 18-month and one-year intensive A-Level courses, as well as one and two-year GCSE courses. Ashbourne was also one of the first colleges to offer Easter Revision courses to both internal and external students, which they continue to offer.

Ashbourne offers courses in over 25 different A-Level subjects and allows any combination of subjects.

For GCSE students, the standard programme is a one year intensive course. Students take five core subjects: Maths, Science, English Literature, English Language and a major European language. They then choose from a range of optional subjects. Students also take part in PSHEE (personal, social, health and economic education) and PE (physical education) for two hours each per week. Lessons take place between 9am and 4pm, including one hour lunch break from 1pm to 2pm. Each subject receives four hours’ teaching per week.

There is also the option of a two-year GCSE programme, which allows students to take their core subjects in the first year and optional subjects in the second, with the chance to begin studying select A-Level subjects early. This course is reserved for particularly academically strong students.

Teaching hours at Ashbourne are higher than average, at around six hours per subject per week. Lessons fall in two hour slots with a ten minute break on the hour.

History 
Ashbourne was originally set up as a tutorial college in 1981. Its founder and current principal, Mike Kirby was previously working as a tutor in Mathematics and Physics and launched Ashbourne to specialise predominantly in A-Level retake tuition, as well as support for applications to the Universities of Cambridge and Oxford. At that time, Ashbourne specialised in Mathematics, Sciences and Economics.

After continued success and establishing a fine reputation for positive grade outcomes, Ashbourne was able to expand and focus on offering full two-year A-Level programmes, with retakes now only making up around 5% of the cohort.

Ashbourne’s rising reputation has been accompanied by significant development both in student numbers and in the size and quality of its buildings. The single room occupied by Ashbourne in 1981 has evolved into three separate buildings on Kensington High Street each with state of the art facilities. Other aspects of the school have nevertheless remained constant, above all the dedication to small classes, personal attention and emphasis on academic excellence.

Specialised Pathway Programmes 
Ashbourne has pathway programmes set up to provide additional support for those students looking to gain entry to particularly competitive and technical university courses.

Pathway programmes include Medicine, Engineering, Finance, Art and Oxbridge. The programmes consist of weekly meetings that provide personalised guidance in the form of workshops, group activities, seminars, and practice interviews, amongst other things. Each programme is led by a member of Ashbourne's teaching staff with specific experience in the field who will also double up as the student's UCAS tutor.

Extra-curricular activities
Ashbourne offers a wide range of extra-curricular activities to supplement student's studies. These range from clubs and trips such as Bollywood dancing and Go-Karting, to more academic ventures such as seminars on Critical Theory and Astrophysics. The College also offers overseas trips for students and concludes the calendar year with the Ashbourne Revue; a variety show showcasing students' talents in music, theatre, poetry and dance.

Fees and scholarships
The tuition fees for 2021-2022 are £9,500 per term for UK students and £10,000 per term for overseas students. Ashbourne is able to offer partial scholarships based on students' previous academic achievement and performance in the admissions process. There is particular availability of scholarships for students looking to take either Music or Drama at GCSE/A-Level.

References

External links
 Ashbourne College website

1981 establishments in England
Educational institutions established in 1981
Private co-educational schools in London
Private schools in the Royal Borough of Kensington and Chelsea
Sixth form colleges in London